Erivan Nascimento de Lima, known as Erivan (born 21 May 1975) is a Brazilian former footballer who played as a defender.

Club career
He played 4 seasons and 69 games in the Primeira Liga for Boavista.

Honours
Boavista
Primeira Liga: 2000–01

References

External links
 

1975 births
Sportspeople from Pernambuco
Living people
Brazilian footballers
Central Sport Club players
S.C. Freamunde players
Brazilian expatriate footballers
Expatriate footballers in Portugal
Liga Portugal 2 players
Boavista F.C. players
Primeira Liga players
F.C. Maia players
Varzim S.C. players
Rio Preto Esporte Clube players
Association football defenders